Sheryl Lee Ralph OJ (born December 30, 1956) is an American actress and singer. She made her screen debut in the 1977 comedy film A Piece of the Action, before landing the role of Deena Jones in the Broadway musical Dreamgirls (1981), for which she was nominated for a Tony Award. , she stars as Barbara Howard on the ABC mockumentary sitcom Abbott Elementary, for which she won a Screen Actors Guild Award and a Critics' Choice Television Award; at the 74th Primetime Emmy Awards, she became the first Black woman in 35 years to win the award for Outstanding Supporting Actress in a Comedy Series, for the role.

Ralph has appeared in a number of films during her career. She starred alongside Denzel Washington in the film The Mighty Quinn (1989). In 1991, she won the Independent Spirit Award for Best Supporting Female for her performance in the 1990 comedy-drama film To Sleep with Anger. Ralph later starred in the 1992 films Mistress and The Distinguished Gentleman. The following year, she portrayed the role of Florence Watson in Sister Act 2: Back in the Habit (1993).

Ralph has also starred in the syndicated television sitcom It's a Living (1986–1989), the short-lived ABC sitcom New Attitude (1990), the Nick at Nite sitcom Instant Mom (2013–2015), and, in 2016, played the role of Madame Morrible in the 2003 Broadway musical Wicked. Her role as Dee Mitchell, in the UPN sitcom Moesha, (1996–2001), earned her five nominations for the NAACP Image Award for Outstanding Supporting Actress in a Comedy Series.

Early life
Ralph was born in Waterbury, Connecticut, the daughter of Stanley Ralph, a college professor, and Ivy Ralph O.D., a Jamaican fashion designer and the creator of the kariba suit. She has a younger brother, actor and comedian Michael Ralph. According to a DNA analysis, she descends partly from the Tikar people of Cameroon. She was raised between Mandeville, Jamaica, and Long Island. Ralph attended Uniondale High School in Uniondale, New York. 

She starred in a high-school production of the musical Oklahoma!, portraying Ado Annie. Sheryl graduated in 1972. Earlier that year, she was crowned Miss Black Teen-age New York. At 19, Ralph was the youngest woman to ever graduate from Rutgers University. During her time at Rutgers, Ralph was one of the earliest winners of the Irene Ryan Acting Scholarships awarded by the Kennedy Center American College Theater Festival. 

That year she was named one of the top ten college women in America by Glamour magazine. Initially she hoped to study medicine, but after dealing with cadavers in a pre-med class and winning a scholarship in a competition at the American College Theater Festival, she gave up medicine for the performing arts. Many years later, she served as the commencement speaker at Rutgers for the Class of 2003.

Career

Ralph began her career in the 1970s, starring in the 1977 American crime comedy film A Piece of the Action directed by Sidney Poitier. She also made several appearances in television shows, such as Good Times, Wonder Woman and The Jeffersons. Ralph then landed a role in the Broadway production Reggae (1980), before portraying Deena Jones in the original Broadway musical Dreamgirls (1981). On television, she was in the cast of the CBS daytime soap opera Search for Tomorrow while starring on Broadway in Dreamgirls. For her performance in Dreamgirls, Ralph was nominated in 1982 for a Tony Award for Best Actress in a Musical. 

Afterwards, she signed with Sid Bernstein's music label, and released her only studio album In the Evening in 1984. The album's title track peaked at No. 5 on the Billboard Dance Music/Club Play Singles chart and No. 64 on the UK Singles Chart that same year. Ralph landed the leading role of Ginger St. James on the television series It's a Living. In 1988 she starred in the Disney film Oliver & Company, providing the voice of Rita, a sassy Afghan Hound. Her first leading role in a film came as Denzel Washington's wife in The Mighty Quinn, released in 1989.

In 1990, she was cast as Vicki St. James in the ABC sitcom New Attitude. The following year, Ralph won the Independent Spirit Award for Best Supporting Female for her performance in the 1990 drama film To Sleep with Anger. In 1992, she starred with Robert De Niro in the title role in Mistress. That same year, she played Etienne Toussaint-Bouvier on Designing Women, and co-starred with Eddie Murphy in The Distinguished Gentleman. She also played Florence Watson, the mother of Rita Louise Watson (Lauryn Hill) in the 1993 film Sister Act 2: Back in the Habit. Her role as Dee Mitchell on Moesha (1996–2001), earned her five nominations for the NAACP Image Award for Outstanding Supporting Actress in a Comedy Series.

During the 1990s she also had roles in The Flintstones, Deterrence, and Unconditional Love.  She provided the voice of Cheetah in Justice League and Justice League Unlimited. Ralph produced Divas Simply Singing, which has become an important AIDS fundraiser. She also appeared on the Showtime series Barbershop as Claire. Sheryl brought a new face to the sufferings of war in the NBC hit series ER. Ralph's 2002 project Baby of the Family concerns a young child who is born with a caul over her head, which enables her to see ghosts and the future. Ralph was also featured with son Etienne on MTV's My Super Sweet 16 and BET's Baldwin Hills, as well as an episode of Clean House that also featured her two children, Etienne and Ivy-Victoria (aka Coco), named after Ralph's mother.

On June 16, 2009, it was announced that Ralph would join the cast of the Broadway-bound musical The First Wives Club as Elyse. She replaced Adriane Lenox, who withdrew from the show due to health concerns. In 2011, Ralph guest-starred in the Young Justice episode "Terrors" as Amanda Waller. In 2013, Ralph appeared in the NBC television show Smash as Cynthia, the mother of Jennifer Hudson's character. On February 9, 2013, Ralph appeared at the 2013 Columbus Middle School youth rally in Columbus, Mississippi. In August 2014, she appeared on KTLA Los Angeles Morning News as a fill-in entertainment reporter. In November 2014, Ralph appeared on Nicky, Ricky, Dicky & Dawn as the rich lady who claims her dog from Nicky, Ricky, Dicky, and Dawn.

Some of her recent TV appearances include the TNT dramedy Claws, and on the Nickelodeon sitcom Instant Mom as Stephanie's (Tia Mowry-Hardrict's) mother.

From January 10 to April 11, 2019 Ralph appeared as one of the main characters, Rose, in the television series Fam which ran for one season and was canceled in May 2019. In 2022, Ralph joined the new hit sitcom Abbott Elementary, portraying a 30-year veteran elementary school teacher. For her role, Ralph won the Primetime Emmy Award for Outstanding Supporting Actress in a Comedy Series, becoming the second Black actress to win in the category after Jackée Harry, who won in 1987 for 227., and the Critics' Choice Television Award for Best Supporting Actress in a Comedy Series in 2023. In October 2022, Ralph became the recipient of the Order of Jamaica.

In 2023, Ralph performed "Lift Every Voice and Sing", also known as the Black national anthem, at the Super Bowl LVII pre-show.

Personal life
Ralph was married to French businessman Eric Maurice from 1990 to 2001, and they have two children, a son born in 1991 and daughter in 1994. She has been married to Pennsylvania State Senator Vincent Hughes since July 30, 2005.

In July 2004, Ralph was inducted as an honorary member of Delta Sigma Theta sorority at the 47th National Convention in Las Vegas, Nevada.

In May 2008, Ralph was awarded an honorary doctorate of humane letters from Tougaloo College after giving the commencement address.

Filmography

Film

Television

Video games

Stage work

Discography

Albums
In the Evening (1984, The New York Music Company)
"You're So Romantic" (4:38)
"In the Evening" (3:50)
"Give Me Love" (3:34)
"Evolution" (4:02)
"Back to Being in Love" (3:01)
"Be Somebody" (3:35)
"I'm Your Kind of Girl" (3:55)
"B.A.B.Y." (3:15)
"Ready or Not" (3:46)
"I'm So Glad That We Met" (3:56)
Produced and arranged by Trevor Lawrence

Sleigh. (2022)

 “God Rest Ye Merry Gentlemen” (2:11)
 “Holiday Cheer (We Made It)” (4:03)
 “Wreck The Halls” feat. B Slade (1:09)
 “Silent Night” (2:52)
 “Little Drummer Boy” (6:57)
 “I Love The Holidays” feat. J Minor 7 (1:09)
 “Commercial Break” (0:08)
 “Sleigh. (Jingle Bells)” (3:43)
 “The Real Meaning” feat. B Slade (5:26)
 “The Gift” (1:04)
 “Hark The Herald Angels Sing” (1:10)
 “O Holy Night” (3:16)
 “O’ Come All Ye Faithful” feat. Ann Nesby and B Slade (5:24)
 “Muva Has Spoken” feat. Ivy Ralph O.D. (1:06)
 “Silent Night Vibes” feat. Hubie Wang (2:05)

Singles

Awards and nominations

References

External links

 Official website (archived)
 
 
 
 

20th-century American actresses
21st-century American actresses
Living people
Actors from Waterbury, Connecticut
African-American actresses
American actors of Jamaican descent
American film actresses
American television actresses
American voice actresses
American people of Cameroonian descent
American people of Tikar descent
Delta Sigma Theta members
HIV/AIDS activists
Independent Spirit Award for Best Supporting Female winners
Outstanding Performance by a Supporting Actress in a Comedy Series Primetime Emmy Award winners
People from Long Island
People from Mandeville, Jamaica
People from Uniondale, New York
Rutgers University alumni
Spouses of Pennsylvania politicians
Writers from Waterbury, Connecticut
20th-century African-American women
20th-century African-American people
21st-century African-American women
Tikar people
1956 births